The WNBA-NBC Champions League is the annual competition for nine-pin bowling men's clubs, organized by the World Ninepin Bowling Association. It is playing since 2002, and the first season the competition was named as Euroleague.

Competition formula 
WNBA-NBC Champions League tournament has a stable competition formula. The following rules apply:

Qualification 

 16 teams participate in each event.
 Most recent champions are always pre-qualified.
 Top seven teams from the Team World Cup.
 Top five teams from the Team European Cup.
 Top three teams from the Team NBC Cup.
Vacant starting-places will occupy after the ranking exclusively with participants in the Team’s World Cup.

Competition format 

All qualified teams are seeded in the established order to the 16-team bracket. The knock-out ties are played in a two-legged format, with the exception of the final four. The Final Four usually takes place in the weekend at the turn of March and April.

 16 Teams bracket: 
 Title holder vs 5th team of European Cup
 World Cup winner vs 4th team of European Cup
 World Cup runner-up vs 3rd team of NBC Cup
 3rd team of World Cup vs 3rd team of European Cup
 4th team of World Cup vs European Cup Runner-up
 European Cup winner vs 7th team of World Cup
 NBC Cup winner vs 6th team of World Cup
 5th team of World Cup vs NBC Cup runner-up

Records and statistics

Final Four

Winning clubs

Performances by nation

Notes

References

WNBA-NBC Champions League
Nine-pin bowling competitions
Recurring sporting events established in 2002